Princess Yukiko (幸子女王; 14 November 1680 – 18 March 1720) later known as Shōshūmon’in(承秋門院), was an Empress consort of Emperor Higashiyama of Japan.  She was one of only four Empresses during the Edo Period.

She was the daughter of Arisugawa-no-miya Yukihito. She was thus a member of the Arisugawa-no-miya, one of the Imperial family clans. 
She became a part of the Emperor's court in 1697.  She gave birth to a Princess in 1700.  In 1707, she was promoted to a higher rank. In 1708, she was named Empress.  This was one of only four times during the Edo Period for this to occur.

Issue

 First daughter: Imperial Princess Akiko (1700–1756)

Notes

Japanese empresses
1680 births
1720 deaths
Japanese princesses
Princess Yukiko
Princess Yukiko
Princess Yukiko
Princess Yukiko
Princess Yukiko
Princess Yukiko
18th-century Japanese women
Japanese Buddhist nuns
18th-century Buddhist nuns